Folktronic is a 2001 album by Momus. It is a concept album, an, "anthology of fake folk."

Track listing
 "Appalachia"
 "Smooth Folk Singer"
 "Mountain Music"
 "Simple Men"
 "Finnegan the Folk Hero"
 "Protestant Art"
 "U.S. Knitting"
 "Jarre in Hicksville"
 "Tape Recorder Man"
 "Little Apples"
 "Robocowboys"
 "Psychopathia Sexualis"
 "Folk Me Amadeus"
 "Handheld"

Bonus tracks

 "The Penis Song"
 "Heliogabalus"
 "Going for a Walk with a Line"
 "The Lady of Shalott"
 "Mistaken Memories of Medieval Manhattan"
 "Pygmalism"

References

2001 albums
Concept albums
Momus (musician) albums